Alex Easton MLA (born 19 May 1969) is an Independent Unionist politician from Northern Ireland who has been a Member of the Northern Ireland Assembly (MLA) for North Down since 2003.
A former member of the Democratic Unionist Party (DUP), Easton left the party in July 2021, following disagreements over the party's leadership.
He was educated at Gransha Boys High School and Bangor Technical College. He worked in the accident and emergency department in the Newtownards and then the Ulster Hospital as a clerical officer. He is a member of the Orange Order and the Church of Ireland. He served on the North Down Policing Partnership.

As a Democratic Unionist Party politician, he was first elected to North Down Borough Council in 2001 and left Council in December 2013. He was elected to the Northern Ireland Assembly in 2003 for the constituency of North Down and returned again in 2007, 2011, 2016 and again in 2017, when he topped the poll for North Down, having increased his vote each election. Easton stood in North Down in the 2017 General Election and polled 14,940 votes, nearly unseating the sitting MP. In the 2019 General Election, he stood once again in the constituency but was defeated narrowly.He again stood as an independent Unionist MLA and topped the poll for the fifth consecutive time at the 2022 NI Assembly Election.

Easton is opposed to a border poll and has said those politically backing a backstop through Brexit could potentially lead to a border poll and is a threat to the Union, which must be opposed. Easton is also opposed to the Northern Ireland protocol.

He announced his resignation from the DUP on 1 July 2021, stating that he saw no "respect, discipline or decency" in the party's recent behaviour.

He was re-elected as an independent candidate in the 2022 Northern Ireland Assembly election.

In January 2023 his parents, both in their 80s, were killed in a fire at their home in Bangor County Down.

References

External links
 DUP webpage

1969 births
Living people
Democratic Unionist Party MLAs
Democratic Unionist Party parliamentary candidates
Northern Ireland MLAs 2003–2007
Northern Ireland MLAs 2007–2011
Northern Ireland MLAs 2011–2016
Northern Ireland MLAs 2016–2017
Northern Ireland MLAs 2017–2022
Members of North Down Borough Council
Anglicans from Northern Ireland
Northern Ireland MLAs 2022–2027